Paula Maria Kania-Choduń (born 6 November 1992) is a professional Polish tennis player.

Kania-Choduń has won one title in doubles on the WTA Tour, as well as five titles in singles and fourteen in doubles on the ITF Women's Circuit. On 15 June 2015, she reached a career-high singles ranking of world No. 128, and on 2 May 2016, she peaked at No. 58 in the WTA doubles rankings.

Tennis career
Paula was born to Paweł and Zdzisława Kania. She has one sister, Zuzanna. Paula began playing tennis at the age of seven and her favourite surface is hardcourt. She became a professional player in 2008.

2012
Kania and Polina Pekhova won the Tashkent Open title defeating Anna Chakvetadze and Vesna Dolonc in the final, when their opponents retired after losing the first set 2–6. This was Kanias first WTA Tour title of any kind.

2014
Having qualified for her first Grand Slam main draw at Wimbledon, Kania lost in the first round to world No. 2, Li Na, in straight sets. The match was also her first singles main draw of any event, after participating in qualifying at 20 tournaments. Kania continued her momentum by qualifying for another main draw a month later, at the Stanford Classic.

Grand Slam performance timeline

Singles

Doubles

WTA career finals

Doubles: 6 (1 title, 5 runner-ups)

ITF Circuit finals

Singles: 8 (5 titles, 3 runner–ups)

Doubles: 32 (14 titles, 18 runner–ups)

Personal life
In June 2020, she married Paweł Choduń and changed her name to Paula Kania-Choduń. The ceremony took place in Krapkowice.

References

External links

 
 
 

1992 births
Living people
People from Sosnowiec
Polish female tennis players
Sportspeople from Silesian Voivodeship
Tennis players at the 2016 Summer Olympics
Olympic tennis players of Poland
20th-century Polish women
21st-century Polish women